The 2009–10 Crown Prince Cup was the 35th season of the Saudi Crown Prince Cup since its establishment in 1957. This season's competition featured a total of 16 teams, 12 teams from the Pro League, and 4 teams from the qualifying rounds.

Al-Hilal were the two-time defending champions, having retained the trophy in 2009, and won their third consecutive title, defeating Al-Ahli in the final on 19 February 2010. Al-Hilal won their record-extending 9th title and their third title in a row.

Qualifying rounds
All of the competing teams that are not members of the Pro League competed in the qualifying rounds to secure one of 4 available places in the Round of 16. First Division sides Al-Ansar, Al-Faisaly, Al-Tai and Hajer qualified.

Preliminary round 1
The Preliminary Round 1 matches were played on 6 & 12 November 2009.

Preliminary round 2
The Preliminary Round 2 matches were played on 13 & 17 November 2009.

First round
The First Round matches were played on 3 & 4 December 2009.

Second round
The Second Round matches were played on 10 December 2009.

Final round
The Final Round matches were played on 17 December 2009.

Bracket

Note:     H: Home team,   A: Away team

Round of 16
The Round of 16 fixtures were played on 3, 4 and 5 February 2010. All times are local, AST (UTC+3).

Quarter-finals
The Quarter-finals fixtures were played on 9 and 10 February 2010. All times are local, AST (UTC+3).

Semi-finals
The Semi-finals fixtures were played on 14 and 15 February 2010. All times are local, AST (UTC+3).

Final

The final was held on 19 February 2010 in the King Fahd International Stadium in Riyadh. All times are local, AST (UTC+3).

Winner

Top goalscorers
As of 19 February 2010

See also
 2009–10 Saudi Professional League
 2010 King Cup of Champions

References

External links
 Crown Prince Cup 2009/10 History at RSSSF

Saudi Crown Prince Cup seasons
2009–10 domestic association football cups
Crown Prince Cup